Enrogalia is a genus of flies in the family Tachinidae.

Species
Enrogalia morigera Reinhard, 1964

Distribution
California.

References

Diptera of North America
Exoristinae
Tachinidae genera
Monotypic Brachycera genera